Asterivora marmarea is a species of moth in the family Choreutidae. It is endemic to New Zealand and lives in mountainous habitats. It has been observed in the lower parts of the North Island and the upper South Island. The larval host of this species is Celmisia gracilenta and adults of this species are on the wing in December and January.

Taxonomy 
This species was described by Edward Meyrick, collected at Lake Wakatipu at 2200 ft in December, and named Simaethis marmarea. In 1928 George Hudson discussed this species under that name in his book The butterflies and moths of New Zealand. In 1979 J. S. Dugdale placed this species within the genus Asterivora. In 1988 Dugdale confirmed this placement. The male holotype specimen, collected at Lake Wakatipu, is held at the Natural History Museum, London.

Description
Meyrick described this species as follows:
This species is very similar in appearance to A. microlitha but can be distinguished as A. marmarea has more pointed hindwings and a white long, thin line reaching to the tornus.

Distribution

This species is endemic to New Zealand. Along with the type locality of Lake Wakatipu this species has been collected in the Tasman region as well as at Coronet Peak and the Church Hill Wetland.

Behaviour 
Adults of this species are on the wing in December to February.

Habitat and hosts 

This species inhabits mountain terrain. The larvae have been both observed feeding on, as well as raised in captivity on, Celmisia gracilenta.

References

Asterivora
Moths of New Zealand
Moths described in 1888
Endemic fauna of New Zealand
Taxa named by Edward Meyrick
Endemic moths of New Zealand